Nhơn Hội may refer to the following places in Vietnam:

Nhơn Hội, An Giang, a commune of An Phú District
Nhơn Hội, a commune of Qui Nhơn in Bình Định Province